The Israeli travel document in lieu of national passport ( Teudat ma'avar bimkom darkon leumi), commonly but incorrectly called Israeli laissez-passer, is a travel document (provisional passport) issued to citizens of the State of Israel who do not qualify for an ordinary Israeli passport.

It should not be confused with Israeli travel documents issued to non-citizens such as stateless residents of East Jerusalem and non-Israeli residents of the Golan Heights, as well as foreigners who need to leave Israel and are unable to obtain a passport from their country of nationality.

Eligibility
Most Israelis travel on ordinary Israeli passports. Travel documents in lieu of a national passport are issued in exceptional circumstances, which include:

Olim (Jewish immigrants under the Law of Return) and other naturalized Israeli citizens who do not reside in Israel permanently;
Israeli citizens who have lost or damaged more than two passports in the course of 10 years;
Israeli citizens who have not been to Israel for over 10 years.

Status
Although travel document in lieu of national passport is the official name of the document used in the Israeli law and printed on its cover, the biodata page has no mentions of it being a travel document in the strict sense. Instead, it features the name provisional passport in English. The document type position in the machine-readable zone, too, reads PP which stands for "passport; temporary / provisional / emergency". This has been a major source of confusion for both travelers and institutions dealing with travelers, since ordinary passports, provisional passports and refugee travel documents are treated differently by many airlines and border control agencies, and assignment of Israeli travel documents in lieu of national passport to one of these categories often depends on the personal opinon of a specific foreign official.

Types
Depending on the issuing authority and specific circumstances of a citizen who is being issued a travel document in lieu of national passport, validity terms may vary. Israelis who have been absent from the country for 10 or more years are usually issued a travel document valid for just two weeks intended to be used for a single entry to Israel, where they can then apply for an ordinary passport. Biometric travel documents for olim not permanently resident in Israel are valid for 5 years, if issued by the Israeli Ministry of Interior. Israeli diplomatic missions around the world only issue non-biometric documents valid for no longer than 2 years regardless of one's circumstances.

Visa requirements
The Israeli Ministry of Foreign Affairs maintains that travel documents in lieu of national passport are intended primarily for entering and leaving Israel. Using them for traveling to other countries is allowed, but visa-free access is not guaranteed. According to the official website of Israeli diplomatic missions, mutual agreements between Israel and other countries regarding visa exemptions do not necessarily apply to holders of this document.

Nevertheless, multiple countries such as France, Serbia and the Czech Republic clearly state that holders of Israeli travel documents in lieu of national passport are entitled to visa-free access under the same conditions as ordinary Israeli passport holders. Conversely, several other countries such as Canada and the United Kingdom explicitly state that Israeli travel document in lieu of national passport holders do require a visa, while ordinary Israeli passport holders do not.

According to the PRADO (Public Register of Authentic Identity and Travel Documents Online) database maintained by the European Council, two Schengen Area member-states, Malta and Iceland, do not accept Israeli travel documents in lieu of national passport as a valid proof of identity for crossing their borders, which means holders of these documents will not be able to enter these countries regardless of having or not having a visa.

References

Foreign relations of Israel
Law enforcement in Israel